Monday is the day of the week between Sunday and Tuesday. According to the International Organization for Standardization's ISO 8601 standard, it is the first day of the week and in countries that adopt the "Sunday-first" convention, it is the second day of the week.
The name of Monday is derived from Old English Mōnandæg and Middle English Monenday, originally a translation of Latin dies lunae "day of the Moon".

Names

The names of the day of the week were coined in the Roman era, in Greek and Latin, in the case of Monday as
ἡμέρᾱ Σελήνης, diēs Lūnae "day of the Moon".

Many languages use terms either directly derived from these names or loan translations based on them.
The English noun Monday derived sometime before 1200 from monedæi, which itself developed from Old English (around 1000) mōnandæg and mōndæg (literally meaning "moon's day"), which has cognates in other Germanic languages, including Old Frisian mōnadeig, Middle Low German and Middle Dutch mānendag, mānendach (modern Dutch Maandag), Old High German mānetag (modern German Montag), and Old Norse mánadagr (Swedish and Norwegian nynorsk måndag, Icelandic mánudagur. Danish and Norwegian bokmål mandag). The Germanic term is a Germanic interpretation of Latin lunae dies ("day of the moon").
Japanese and Korean share the same ancient Chinese words '月曜日' (Hiragana:げつようび, translit. getsuyо̄bi, Hangul:월요일) for Monday which means "day of the moon".
In many Indo-Aryan languages, the word for Monday is Somavāra or Chandravāra,  Sanskrit loan-translations of "Monday".

In some cases, the "ecclesiastical" names are used, a tradition of numbering the days of the week in order to avoid the "pagan" connotation of the planetary names, and to keep with the biblical name, in which Monday is the "second day" (Hebrew יום שני, Greek Δευτέρα ἡμέρα (Deutéra hēméra), Latin feria secunda, Arabic الأثنين).
In many Slavic languages the name of the day translates to "after Sunday/holiday". Russian понедельник (ponyedyelnik) literally translated, Monday means "next to the week", по "next to" or "on" недельник "(the) week" Croatian and Bosnian ponedjeljak, Serbian понедељак (ponedeljak), Ukrainian понеділок (ponedilok), Bulgarian понеделник (ponedelnik), Polish poniedziałek, Czech pondělí, Slovak pondelok, Slovenian ponedeljek. In Turkish it is called pazartesi, which also means "after Sunday".

Arrangement in the week
Historically, the Greco-Roman week began with Sunday (dies solis), and Monday (dies lunae) was the second day of the week.
It is still the custom to refer to Monday as feria secunda in the  liturgical calendar of the Catholic Church. 
Quakers also traditionally referred to Monday as "Second Day". The Portuguese and the Greek (Eastern Orthodox Church) also retain the ecclesiastical tradition (Portuguese segunda-feira, Greek Δευτέρα "deutéra" "second"). Likewise, the Modern Hebrew name for Monday is yom-sheni (יום שני).

While in North America Sunday is the first day of the week, the Geneva-based International Organization for Standardization places Monday as the first day of the week in its ISO 8601 standard.  Monday is xīngqīyī (星期一) in Chinese, meaning "day one of the week".

Religious observances

Christianity 
In the Eastern Orthodox Church Mondays are days on which the Angels are commemorated. The Octoechos contains hymns on this theme, arranged in an eight-week cycle, that are chanted on Mondays throughout the year. At the end of Divine Services on Monday, the dismissal begins with the words: "May Christ our True God, through the intercessions, of his most-pure Mother, of the honorable, Bodiless Powers (i.e., the angels) of Heaven…". In many Eastern monasteries Mondays are observed as fast days; because Mondays are dedicated to the angels, and monks strive to live an angelic life. In these monasteries, the monks abstain from meat, fowl, dairy products, fish, wine and oil (if a feast day occurs on a Monday, fish, wine and oil may be allowed, depending upon the particular feast).

The Church of Jesus Christ of Latter-day Saints spend one evening per week called Family Home Evening (FHE) or Family Night usually Monday, that families are encouraged to spend together in study, prayer and other family activities. Many businesses owned by Latter-Day Saints close early on Mondays so they and their customers are able to spend more time with their families.

Hinduism
In Hinduism, Mondays are associated with the Hindu god of the moon Chandra or Soma. In several South Asian languages, Monday is knowns as Somavara. Hindus who fast on Mondays do so in dedication to the deity Shiva. Some observe the Solah Somvar Vrat, which is a fast of sixteen Mondays dedicated to Shiva in hopes of getting married and finding a suitable partner. Fasting on Mondays in the Hindu month of Shravana is also considered auspicious as it is one of the holiest months to Hindus and dedicated to Shiva and his consort Parvati.

Islam 
In Islam, Mondays are one of the days in a week in which Muslims are encouraged to do voluntary fasting, the other being Thursdays. There are a number of Hadith which narrated of Muhammad fasting on these days.

According to the same Hadith, Muhammad was born on Monday. It is also narrated that he received his first revelation (which would later become the Qur'an) on Monday.

Judaism 
In Judaism Mondays are considered auspicious days for fasting. The Didache warned early Christians not to fast on Mondays to avoid Judaizing, and suggests Wednesdays instead.

In Judaism, a small portion of the weekly Parashah in Torah is read in public on Monday and Thursday mornings, as a supplement for the Saturday reading). Special penitential prayers are recited on Monday unless there is a special occasion for happiness which cancels them. According to the Mishna and Talmud, these traditions are due to Monday and Thursday being "the market days" when people gathered from the towns to the city. 

A tradition of Ashkenazi Jews to voluntarily fast on the first consecutive Monday Thursday and Monday of the Hebrew month is prevalent among the ultra-orthodox. 

In Hebrew, Monday is called "Yom Shayne," meaning literally "Second Day" following the biblical reference to the sabbath day as the "Seventh-day" and the tradition of that day being on Saturday. It has been established that the phonetic and cultural link between the planet Saturn, Saturday and the Sabbath day is of ancient Mesopotamian origin.

Cultural references

A number of popular songs in Western culture feature Monday, often as a day of depression, anxiety, avolition, hysteria, or melancholy (mostly because of its association with the first day of the workweek). For example, "Monday, Monday" (1966) from the Mamas & the Papas, "Rainy Days and Mondays" (1971) from the Carpenters, "I Don't Like Mondays" (1979) from the Boomtown Rats, Monday, Monday, Monday (2002) from Tegan and Sara, and "Manic Monday" (1986) from the Bangles (written by Prince).

There is a band named the Happy Mondays and an American pop-punk band Hey Monday.

The popular comic strip character Garfield by Jim Davis is well known for his disdain for Mondays.

In the United Kingdom, more people commit suicide in England and Wales on Mondays than other days of the week; more people in the country in general call in sick; and more people worldwide surf the web.

In July 2002, the consulting firm PricewaterhouseCoopers announced that it would rename its consultancy practice "Monday", and would spend $110 million over the next year to establish the brand. When IBM acquired the consultancy three months later it chose not to retain the new name.

On October 17, 2022, Guinness World Records announced on Twitter that Monday is the 'Worst Day of the Week''', to the dismay of some people.

Named days
 Big Monday
 Black Monday
 Blue Monday
 Clean Monday (Ash Monday)
 Cyber Monday
 Easter Monday, also Bright Monday or Wet Monday
 First Monday
 Handsel Monday
 Lundi Gras
 Mad Monday
 Miracle Monday
 Plough Monday
 Shrove Monday
 Wet Monday
 Whit Monday

See also

 Monday Club
 Monday demonstrations
 Monday Night Football Monday Night Raw
 WCW Monday Nitro Monday Night Wars
 Saint Monday

Notes

References

 Barnhart, Robert K. (1995). The Barnhart Concise Dictionary of Etymology''. HarperCollins. 

 
1 Monday
Selene